Bloodletter or Blood Letter may refer to:

Bloodletting, using leeches
"Bloodletter", song by Saxon from Unleash the Beast 1997
Bloodletter, Star Trek Deep Space Nine novel by K. W. Jeter
Blood Letter (film), Vietnamese film
The Bloody Letter (Bulgarian: Кърваво писмо), letter by Bulgarian revolutionary Todor Kableshkov, anti-Ottoman April Uprising of 1876